Just a Game (foaled 1976 in Ireland) was a Champion Thoroughbred racehorse who competed in Ireland and in the United States where she was recorded as Just A Game II. In 1980, she won the Eclipse Award as the American Champion Female Turf Horse.

The Grade 1 Just A Game Stakes at Belmont Park is raced in her honor.

References

External links
 Just A Game's pedigree and partial racing stats

1976 racehorse births
Racehorses bred in Ireland
Racehorses trained in Ireland
Racehorses trained in the United States
Eclipse Award winners
Thoroughbred family 2-e